Alice Randall is an American author and songwriter. She is well known for her novel and New York Times bestseller The Wind Done Gone, which is a reinterpretation and parody of the popular 1936 novel Gone with the Wind.

Early life
Mari-Alice Randall was born on May 4, 1959 in Detroit, Michigan. She attended Harvard University, where she earned an honors degree in English and American literature, before moving to Nashville in 1983 to become a country songwriter. She currently lives in Nashville, Tennessee.  Alice Randall was previously married twice, first to Avon N. Williams and then David Ewing. She is a writer-in-residence at Vanderbilt University and teaches courses including a seminar on the country music lyric in American literature.

Career

Music
Randall is the first African-American woman to co-write a number-one country hit. The single "XXX's and OOO's (An American Girl)" was released in 1994 by country music singer Trisha Yearwood. Over 20 of her songs have been recorded, including several top 10 and top 40 records; her songs have been performed by Trisha Yearwood and Mark O'Connor.

Writing

Fiction
Randall is the author of six fiction novels:
 The Wind Done Gone (Houghton Mifflin Company, 2001)
 Pushkin and the Queen of Spades (2004)
 Rebel Yell (2009)
Ada's Rules: A Sexy Skinny Novel (2012)
The Diary of B.B. Bright, Possible Princess (2013) winner of the Phillis Wheatley Award
Black Bottom Saints (2020)

Her first novel The Wind Done Gone, is a reinterpretation and parody of Margaret Mitchell's 1936 novel Gone with the Wind. The Wind Done Gone essentially tells the same story as Gone with the Wind but from the viewpoint of Scarlett O'Hara's half-sister Cynara, a mulatto slave on Scarlett's plantation.

Randall and her publishing company, Houghton Mifflin, were sued in April 2001 by Mitchell's estate on the grounds that The Wind Done Gone infringed the copyright of Gone with the Wind. The lawsuit, Suntrust v. Houghton Mifflin Co., was eventually settled, allowing The Wind Done Gone to be published with the addition of a label describing it as "An Unauthorized Parody". In addition, Houghton Mifflin agreed to make a financial contribution to the Morehouse College, a historically black education institution in Atlanta supported by the Mitchell estate. The novel became a New York Times bestseller.

Randall's second novel, Pushkin and the Queen of Spades, was named as one of The Washington Post'''s "Best fiction of 2004."

Non-fiction
Published by Random House in 2015, the cookbook Soul Food Love was co-written by Randall and her daughter, the author and poet, Caroline Randall Williams. In February 2016, the book received the 2016 NAACP Image Award for Literature (Instructional).

In 2006, Alice Randall also wrote My Country Roots'', alongside Carter and Courtney Little.  She published this non-fiction piece in Nashville, by Naked Ink.

Awards 
Randall received the Al Neuharth Free Spirit Award in 2001 and the Literature Award of Excellence from the Memphis Black Writers Conference in 2002. She was a finalist for an NAACP Image Award in 2002. Randall was inducted into the Silver Circle in 2008, in honor of her work in the country music industry. Randall was also accepted for a prestigious writing residency at the famed Yaddo artist's community from June 23, 2011, to July 24, 2011. Randall and her daughter, Caroline Randall Williams, received the 2016 NAACP Image Award for Literature (Instructional) for their book, Soul Food Love.

Songs 
 The Ballad of Sally Anne – Mark O'Connor, River City Ramblers
 Big Dream – Samantha Mathis
 Blinded By Stars – Adrienne Young
 Get the Hell Out of Dodge – Walter Hyatt
 Girls Ride Horses Too – Judy Rodman
 I'll Cry for Yours (Will You Cry for Mine) – Tamra Rosanes
 Many Mansions – Moe Bandy
 Reckless Night – The Forester Sisters
 Small Towns (Are Smaller for Girls) – Holly Dunn
 Solitary Hero – Carole Elliot
 The Resurrection – The Nitty Gritty Dirt Band
 Went for a Ride – Radney Foster
 Who's Minding the Garden – Glen Campbell
 XXX's and OOO's (An American Girl) – Trisha Yearwood

See also 

 Black veganism

References

External links

Alice Randall official website

1959 births
Living people
21st-century American novelists
African-American novelists
American women novelists
Songwriters from Michigan
Harvard College alumni
Writers from Detroit
People from Nashville, Tennessee
21st-century American women writers
Songwriters from Tennessee
Novelists from Michigan
Novelists from Tennessee
African-American women musicians
21st-century African-American women writers
21st-century African-American writers
20th-century African-American people
20th-century African-American women